Machard may refer to:
 Klemheist knot, also known as a French Machard knot
 Autoblock, also known as a Machard knot
 Prosecutor Machard, a character in the French television series Spiral
 Alfred Machard, author La Femme d'une nuit
 Madame Machard, a character in the 1924 French film Mimi Pinson
 M. Machard, a character in the 1953 French film Le Chevalier de la nuit

See also
 The Visions of Simone Machard